Adeixis is a genus of moths in the family Geometridae described by Warren in 1897.

Species
Adeixis baeckeae Holloway, 1979 New Caledonia
Adeixis griseata Hudson, 1903 New Zealand
Adeixis inostentata Walker, 1861 Australia
Adeixis major Holloway, 1979 New Caledonia
Adeixis montana Holloway, 1979 New Caledonia

References

Oenochrominae
Geometridae genera